Cruentomycena viscidocruenta, commonly known as the ruby bonnet, is a species of agaric fungus in the family Mycenaceae. It is found in moist forested areas of Australia and New Zealand, often in small groups on rotting wood. Care in identification needs to be made to distinguish the ruby bonnet from red forms of Hygrocybe mushrooms.

References

External links

Mycenaceae
Fungi described in 1924
Fungi of Australia
Fungi of New Zealand